Rahimabad Rural District is a rural district (dehestan) in Rahimabad District, Rudsar County, Gilan Province, Iran. At the 2006 census, its population was 10,193, in 2,597 families. The rural district has 53 villages.

References 

Rural Districts of Gilan Province
Rudsar County